The Babes in the Wood murders may refer to any of the following child murder cases:
Babes in the Wood murders (Pine Grove Furnace), 1934; between Maryland and Pennsylvania, USA
Babes in the Wood murders (Stanley Park), ; Vancouver, Canada
Babes in the Wood murders (Epping Forest), 1970; Essex, England
Babes in the Wood murders (Brighton), 1986; Sussex, England

See also 
Babes in the Wood, also known as Children of the Wood, a traditional children's tale.